Secondary systemic amyloidosis is a condition that involves the adrenal gland, liver, spleen, and kidney as a result of amyloid deposition due to a chronic disease such as Behçet's disease, ulcerative colitis, etc. The condition is caused by an abornamility in plasma cell.s

See also 
 Amyloidosis
 Primary systemic amyloidosis
 List of cutaneous conditions

References 

Skin conditions resulting from errors in metabolism